Anomiopus nigrocoeruleus is a species of true dung beetle that can be found in Argentina, Brazil and Paraguay. It can be found in cerrado and chaco biomes. It may be a myrmecophile.

References

nigrocoeruleus
Beetles described in 1955